96th meridian may refer to:

96th meridian east, a line of longitude east of the Greenwich Meridian
96th meridian west, a line of longitude west of the Greenwich Meridian